Francisco Razo (born February 3, 1985) is a former Mexican professional footballer who last played for Irapuato FC.

Honours

Club
Irapuato
 Ascenso MX: Clausura 2011
 Ascenso MX runner up: Apertura 2009

References

1985 births
Living people
People from Irapuato
Footballers from Guanajuato
Irapuato F.C. footballers
Mexican footballers
Association football defenders